Paleologo Zaccaria ( ? –1314) was the Lord of Chios and Phocaea, as well as other Aegean islands from 1307 until his death. 

Paleologo was the son of Benedetto I Zaccaria Lord of Chios and Pocaea; his mother was a Palaiologina, sister of the Emperor Michael VIII. His first name is unknown, as is the first name of his mother. On the death of his father, he succeeded him.

The brothers Benedetto II Zaccaria and Martino Zaccaria were his sons (or his cousins, sons of Nicolino Zaccaria).

Sources
 
Setton, Kenneth M. (general editor) A History of the Crusades: Volume III — The Fourteenth and Fifteenth Centuries. Harry W. Hazard, editor. University of Wisconsin Press: Madison, 1975.
Setton, Kenneth M. Catalan Domination of Athens 1311–1380. Revised edition. Variorum: London, 1975.

1235 births
1314 deaths
Christians of the Crusades
Paleologo
Paleologo
14th-century rulers in Europe
13th-century Genoese people
14th-century Genoese people